Perlorita is a genus of moths belonging to the family Tortricidae.

Species
Perlorita pilumgestatum Razowski & Pelz, 2001

See also
List of Tortricidae genera

References

 , 2005: World catalogue of insects volume 5 Tortricidae.
 , 2001: Tortricidae (Lepidoptera) collected in Ecuador in the years 1996–1999: Tortricini and Cochylini. Nachrichten des Entomologischen Vereins Apollo NF 22 (1): 17–28 (27).

External links
tortricidae.com

Cochylini
Tortricidae genera